() is a sangkat (quarter) in Doun Kaev Municipality, Takéo Province, Cambodia.

Administration 
As of 2019,  has 14 phums (villages) as follows.

References 

Communes of Takéo province
Roka Krau, Sangkat